José Antonio Redondo Ramos (born 5 March 1985 in Alcázar de San Juan) is a Spanish former racing cyclist who last rode for UCI Professional Continental team Andalucía–CajaSur.

In 2007, riding for Astana, Redondo finished second in the 2nd stage of both the Critérium du Dauphiné Libéré and the Vuelta al País Vasco. Redondo was sacked from Astana in September 2007 after "failing to abide by team rules".

Major results

 2006 Vuelta a España – 47th
 National Time Trial U23 Championship – 3rd (2005)

References

External links

Spanish male cyclists
1985 births
Living people
Sportspeople from the Province of Ciudad Real
Cyclists from Castilla-La Mancha